Gu Sung-eun (born 19 August 1984) is a South Korean professional racing cyclist.

Career
Having finished third in the road race in the 2007 UCI B World Championships and second in the time trial, Gu qualified to represent her country at the 2008 Summer Olympics in Beijing. Gu crashed in the road race when she lost control of her bike on the wet roads, bringing others down with her. She eventually found herself falling into a concrete ditch on the side of the highway but got back on her bike to finish 59th.

Major results
Source: 

2002
 UCI Junior Track Cycling World Championships
2nd  Points race
2nd  Scratch
2003
 Asian Track Championships
2nd  Elimination race
2nd  Team pursuit
3rd  Scratch
2004
 2nd  Scratch, UCI Track Cycling World Cup Classics, Sydney
2005
 Asian Track Championships
1st  Points race
1st  Team pursuit
3rd  Individual pursuit
2007
 UCI B World Championships
2nd  Time trial
3rd  Road race
 Asian Track Championships
2nd  Scratch
3rd  Keirin
 3rd  Road race, Asian Road Championships
2011
 1st  Road race, Summer Universiade
 2nd  Road race, Asian Road Championships
2012
 2nd  Road race, Asian Road Championships
 9th Overall Tour of Thailand
2014
 3rd  Road race, Asian Road Championships
2015
 1st  Road race, National Road Championships
2020
 2nd Madison, National Track Championships (with Kim Hyun-ji)

References

External links

1984 births
Living people
South Korean female cyclists
Olympic cyclists of South Korea
Cyclists at the 2008 Summer Olympics
Cyclists at the 2006 Asian Games
Cyclists at the 2014 Asian Games
Universiade medalists in cycling
Universiade gold medalists for South Korea
Asian Games competitors for South Korea
20th-century South Korean women
21st-century South Korean women